Dr. Nausheen Hamid (born 19 February 1961) is a Pakistani politician and social activist who had been a member of the National Assembly of Pakistan from August 2018 till January 2023. She is the current Parliamentary Secretary for the Ministry of National Health Services, Regulation, and Coordination, in office since September 2018.

Previously, she was a member of the Provincial Assembly of the Punjab (W-356), from 2013 to 2018 (16th Assembly). She served as a Member of the Syndicate Board of Fatima Jinnah Medical University during this tenure.

Former Regional Organiser, Pakistan Tehreek-e-Insaf from 2010 to 2012. Former Central Vice President Women Wing, Pakistan Tehreek-e-Insaf from 2012 to 2013. Current President, Central Working Committee for Insaf Women Wing, Pakistan Tehreek-e-Insaf, notified on 4 February 2020.

Early life and education
She was born on 19 February 1961, in Lahore. She spent her early life in Karachi.

Her father, Gulzar Ahmad Qureshi, was a civil servant and served as a Commissioner of Income Tax in the Government of Pakistan.

Primary schooling from Sacred Heart School in Karachi, Class of 1971. Secondary Schooling from Mama Parsi Girls' Secondary School, Alumni of 1976. High School from St Joseph's Convent School. She earned the degree of Bachelor of Medicine and Bachelor of Surgery (MBBS) with Distinction in Bio-Chemistry from Dow Medical College, Class of 1986.

As a medical doctor, she served as a demonstrator in Fatima Jinnah Medical College, Lahore, from 1989–90 and later as Medical Officer in Jinnah Hospital, Lahore.

Former General Secretary, Business and Professional Women's Foundation, Lahore Chapter, from 2006 to 2015

Political Background

Belongs to a well-known political family of Lahore, Pakistan. Her father-in-law, Mian Miraj Din Late (1927-2005), Senior Vice President of PML Punjab, was elected a Member Provincial Assembly of West Pakistan from 1962 to 1965 (Parliamentary Secretary for Basic Democracies & Local Government) and 1965-69 (Parliamentary Secretary for Services & General Administration and Home, Labour and Jails). He remained a Member Provincial Assembly of the Punjab from 1993 to 1996 & 1997-99 and functioned as Minister for Excise and taxation department, Punjab (Pakistan).

Her husband, Mian Hamid Miraj, served as Deputy Mayor of Lahore from 1993 to 1996. He contested the 2010 by-election from NA-123 after Javed Hashmi vacated the seat, on the ticket of Pakistan Tehreek-e-Insaf. He was elected as Senior Vice President Punjab, Pakistan Tehreek-e-Insaf, in the 2013 Intra-Party elections.

Ahsan Rashid Late (1944-2014), a well-known Pakistani businessman, politician, and philanthropist was her first cousin. He was among the top leaders who were founding members of the PTI and a close aide of Imran Khan. He served as President of Pakistan Tehreek-e-Insaf Punjab.

Political career 
She has been politically active on a grass roots level since the early 1990s while managing election campaigns for her father-in-law's and husband's elections.

Joined Pakistan Tehreek-e-Insaf as her first political party in 2009 and served as Regional Organiser in the Women Wing from 2010 to 2012.

In May 2013, she was elected to the Provincial Assembly of the Punjab as a candidate of Pakistan Tehreek-e-Insaf (PTI) on a reserved seat for women in the 2013 Pakistani general election.

She was nominated as vice president of the Central Women Wing Pakistan Tehreek-e-Insaf on 3 August 2014, while representing the party in the Punjab Assembly on opposition benches.

She was elected to the National Assembly of Pakistan as a candidate of Pakistan Tehreek-e-Insaf (PTI) on a seat reserved for women from Punjab in the 2018 Pakistani general election.

On 27 September 2018, Prime Minister Imran Khan appointed her as Federal Parliamentary Secretary for the Ministry of National Health Services, Regulation, and Coordination.

She has been notified on 4 February 2020, as current President Central Working Committee for Insaf Women Wing, Pakistan Tehreek-e-Insaf and taken oath on 14 February 2020.

Works in Health Sector

Public Awareness for COVID-19 

 Educating public and spreading awareness by emphasis on social distancing and self isolation.

Tobacco Control 

 Legislation to control tobacco use.

Health Indicators 

 Improving Health Indicators and achieving Sustainable Development Goal 3 (SDG-3) targets through universal health coverage in Pakistan.

Children's Health 

 Discourage smoking in children through campaign for tobacco free kids.

Malnutrition 

Owning malnutrition as part of the public agenda

Social Media Accounts

Twitter

Instagram

Resignation

In April 2022, she also resigned from the National Assembly seat along with all Tehreek-e-Insaaf members after the Foreign-imposed Regime Change by the United States.

External links

More reading
 List of members of the 15th National Assembly of Pakistan
 List of Pakistan Tehreek-e-Insaf elected members (2013–2018)
 No-confidence motion against Imran Khan

References

Living people
Dow Medical College alumni
Punjab MPAs 2013–2018
1961 births
Pakistan Tehreek-e-Insaf MNAs
Pakistani MNAs 2018–2023